One of the newest stadiums in Kuwait after the opening of the renovated Jaber Al-Ahmad International Stadium back on 18 December 2015. it mainly constructed for Olympic teams across the country the area also has Indoor courts and venues for other sports since the place is called the Olympic Sports City

History  
It was Officially unveiled on July 5, 2016 at the opening and at the same time announced another project Sabah Al-Salem University Sports City. Along with the opening it said that matches will be played as soon as the ban from FIFA is removed.

References 

Football venues in Kuwait
Athletics (track and field) venues in Kuwait
Multi-purpose stadiums in Kuwait